Izz al-Din Aybak (epithet: al-Malik al-Mu'izz Izz al-Din Aybak al-Jawshangir al-Turkmani al-Salihi) was the first of the Mamluk sultans of Egypt in the Turkic Bahri line. He ruled from 1250 until his death in 1257.

Origin and early career

Aybak (moon; baig, commander) was an Emir/commander of Turkic origin who served with other Turkmens in the court of the Ayyubid sultan as-Salih Ayyub and therefore was known among the Bahri Mamluks as Aybak al-Turkmani. He raised to the position of Emir (commander) and worked as a Jashnkir (taster of the sultan's food and drink, or cupbearer) and used the rank of a Khawanja (Sultan's accountant).

After the death of as-Salih Ayyub during the Frankish invasion of Damietta in 1249 and the murder of his heir and son Turanshah in 1250, Shajar al-Durr, the widow of as-Salih Ayyub, with the help and support of the Mamluks of her late husband, seized the throne and became the Sultana of Egypt. The Ayyubids lost control over Egypt.

Both the Ayyubids in Syria and the Abbasid Caliph al-Musta'sim in Baghdad defied the Mamluk move in Egypt and refused to recognize Shajar al-Durr as a Sultana but the Mamluks in Egypt renewed their oath to the new Sultana, and she appointed Aybak to the important position of Atabeg (commander in chief).

Rise to power (1250)
Feeling uneasy when the Syrian Emirs refused to pay homage to Shajar al-Durr and granted Damascus to an-Nasir Yusuf the Ayyubid emir of Aleppo, Shajar al-Durr married Aybak then abdicated and passed the throne to Aybak after she ruled Egypt for 80 days, starting on May 2, 1250.

Aybak, from the end of July 1250 the new sultan of Egypt, was given the royal name al-Malik al-Muizz. Until then, Aybak relied foremost on four Mamluks: Faris ad-Din Aktai, Baibars al-Bunduqdari, Qutuz and Bilban al-Rashidi.

Aybak's formal rule ended after just five days. To consolidate his position of Aybak, and attempting to satisfy their opponents in Syria and Baghdad, the Bahri Mamluks installed the 6-year-old al-Ashraf Musa, who was one of the Syrian branch of the Ayyubid family as a Sultan and announced that Aybak is merely a representative of the Abbasid Caliph in Baghdad. In addition, and to display his loyalty to his deceased Ayyubid master as-Salih Ayyub, Aybak organised a funeral ceremony for as-Salih and buried him in the tomb which as-Salih had built for himself before his death near his madrasah in the district of Bain al-Qasrain in Cairo. Nevertheless, the actual power in Egypt was still exercised by Aybak, who had returned to his position of atabak (atabeg).

Ayyubid challenge
An-Nasir Yusuf sent his forces to Gaza to conquer Egypt and overthrow Aybak but his forces were defeated by Emir Faris ad-Din Aktai in October 1250. Then he led a huge army and clashed with Aybak's army near Al-Salihiyya, not far from Cairo, but at the end of the battle he was forced to flee to Damascus while his son Turanshah, his brother Nosrat ad-Din and al-Malik al-Ashraf the Emir of Aleppo were among the prisoners caught by Aybak's army. Aybak's triumphs over the Ayyobids of Syria consolidated his position as a ruler of Egypt. Through negotiation and mediation of the Abbasid Caliph, Aybak freed the Ayyubid prisoners and gained control over southern Palestine including Gaza and Jerusalem and the Syrian coast. Feeling secure by his victories and his agreement with the Ayyubids, Aybak imprisoned the young Ayyubid co-sultan Musa and appointed Qutuz as vice-sultan in 1252.

Rebellion
In 1253, a serious rebellion led by Hisn al-Din Thalab in Upper and Middle Egypt was crushed by Aktai, the leader of the Bahri Mamluks. By defeating the Ayyubid forces of An-Nasir Yusuf and the crushing of the rebellion of Thalab the power of Emir Aktai and his Mamluks increased and they began to form a new threat to the authority of Aybak. When Aktai asked Aybak to allow him to live inside the citadel with his future wife who was the sister of al-Malik al-Mansour, the Emir of Hama, Aybak became convinced that Aktai and his Mamluks had the intention to overthrow him and, thus, he decided to get rid of them.

Crackdown on Mamluks (1254–55)
In 1254, in a conspiracy with Qutuz and a few Mamluks, Aybak invited Aktai to the citadel and had him murdered. Watching the head of Aktai thrown out from the citadel, the Bahriyya Mamluks, among them Baibars al-Bunduqdari and  Qalawun al-Alfi, fled during the night to Damascus, al-Karak and the Seljuk Sultanate of Rûm. Aybak plundered the properties of the Bahriyya Mamluks and retracted Alexandria which Aktai controlled as own domain since 1252. Those who could not flee were either imprisoned or executed. As soon as he finished with Aktai and his Bahriyya Mamluks, Aybak dethroned the child co-sultan al-Ashraf Musa and sent him back to his aunts' house, which was his home before they had made him a co-sultan. Now Aybak was the absolute and sole ruler of Egypt and parts of Syria, but shortly afterwards he settled a new agreement with an-Nasir Yusuf, which limited his power to Egypt only.

In 1255 a new rebellion led by his namesake Izz al-Din Aybak al-Afram arose in upper Egypt and forces of an-Nasir Yusuf arrived to the Egyptian border, this time accompanied by the Bahriyya Mamluks who had fled to Syria, including Baibars al-Bunduqdari and Qalawun al-Alfi.

End
Being in need to form an alliance with an ally who could help him against the threat of the Mamluks who had fled to Syria, Aybak decided in 1257 to marry the daughter of Badr ad-Din Lu'lu', the emir of Mosul. Shajar al-Durr, who already had disputes with Aybak felt betrayed by the man who she made sultan, and had him murdered after he had ruled Egypt seven years. On the day of his death he was about 60 years old and had a few sons, among them Nasir ad-Din Khan and al-Mansur Ali.

Aybak's 11-year-old son Ali was installed by his loyal Mamluks (Mu'iziyya Mamluks), who were led by Qutuz. The new sultan took the royal name al-Malik al-Mansur Nour ad-Din Ali with Qutuz as a vice-sultan.

Impact
Aybak was not liked nor respected by the Egyptians though he was remembered by the historian as a courageous and generous Sultan.

Aybak ruled in a turbulent time. In addition to his conflicts with an-Nasir Yusuf in Syria and Emir Aktai and his Mamluks in Egypt, there were threats from external forces, namely the Crusaders and Louis IX of France who were in Acre waiting for a chance to score a success against the Muslims after their humiliating defeat in Egypt in 1250, and the Mongols led by Hulagu who were starting to raid the eastern borders of the Islamic world.

Before their deaths, Aybak and Shajar al-Durr firmly established the Mamluk Sultanate that would ultimately repulse the Mongols, expel the European Crusaders from the Holy Land, and would remain the most powerful political force in the Middle East until the coming of the Ottomans.

Aibak built a Madrasah in Cairo known by the name al-Madrasah al-Mu'izzyah.

See also
 An-Nasir Yusuf
 Bahri dynasty
 Kipchaks
 List of rulers of Egypt

Footnotes

References

Sources
 Abu al-Fida, The Concise History of Humanity
 Al-Maqrizi, Al Selouk Leme'refatt Dewall al-Melouk, Dar al-kotob, 1997.
 Idem in English: Bohn, Henry G., The Road to Knowledge of the Return of Kings, Chronicles of the Crusades, AMS Press, 1969.
 Al-Maqrizi, al-Mawaiz wa al-'i'tibar bi dhikr al-khitat wa al-'athar,Matabat aladab, Cairo 1996, .
 Idem in French: Bouriant, Urbain, Description topographique et historique de l'Egypte,Paris 1895
 Ibn Taghri, al-Nujum al-Zahirah Fi Milook Misr wa al-Qahirah, al-Hay'ah al-Misreyah 1968
 History of Egypt, 1382–1469 A.D. by Yusef. William Popper, translator Abu L-Mahasin ibn Taghri Birdi, University of California Press 1954
 Mahdi, Dr. Shafik, Mamalik Misr wa Alsham ( Mamluks of Egypt and the Levant), Aldar Alarabiya, Beirut 2008
 Qasim, Abdu Qasim Dr., Asr Salatin AlMamlik ( era of the Mamluk Sultans ), Eye for human and social studies, Cairo 2007
 Sadawi,H., Al-Mamalik, Maroof Ikhwan, Alexandria.
 Shayal, Jamal, Prof. of Islamic history,  Tarikh Misr al-Islamiyah (History of Islamic Egypt), dar al-Maref, Cairo 1266, 
 The New Encyclopædia Britannica, Macropædia, H.H. Berton Publisher, 1973–1974

Bahri sultans
Egyptian nobility
13th-century Mamluk sultans
Muslims of the Seventh Crusade
1257 deaths
Year of birth unknown
Regents of Egypt